Lycée Français Charlemagne is a French international school in Pointe-Noire, Republic of the Congo. It serves levels maternelle (preschool) through lycée (senior high school).

References

External links
 Lycée Français Charlemagne

French international schools in the Republic of the Congo
Buildings and structures in Pointe-Noire